Eidsfjorden may refer to many different fjords in Norway:

Eidsfjorden (Askvoll), a fjord in Askvoll municipality, Sogn og Fjordane county
Eidsfjorden (Gulen), a fjord in Gulen municipality, Sogn og Fjordane county
Eidsfjorden (Hordaland), a fjord in Vaksdal municipality, Hordaland county
Eidsfjorden (Nordland), a fjord in Hadsel and Sortland municipalities in Nordland county
Eidsfjorden (Sogn og Fjordane), a fjord in Eid municipality, Sogn og Fjordane county 
Eidsfjorden (Sogndal), a fjord in Sogndal municipality, Sogn og Fjordane county
Eidsfjorden (Vest-Agder), a fjord in Farsund municipality, Vest-Agder county